Absolute democracy is a hypothetical form of government presenting an extreme of power exercised directly by citizens.

It should not to be confused with power democracy as found in the Swiss political system (in which elective activities for the adjustment of social/political matters are more frequent than in other democracies).

Absolute democracy presents a risk that the interests of the majority will be prioritized while the needs of any minorities may be ignored. Although democracy in general strives to make the people content, absolute democracy lacks protections to allow the minority to be heard or acknowledged.

As Francis Devine explains in "Absolute Democracy or Indefeasible Right: Hobbes Versus Locke", there was a tension in American politics between absolute democracy and liberalism. Devine explains liberalism as, "the insistence that certain basic human freedoms are beyond abridgment".

Absolute democracy lacks protections commonly seen in modern democratic systems. For example, in an absolute democracy there is no requirement for a "supermajority" to vote on any issue (i.e., every issue can be decided by a bare 50% vote). A requirement for a supermajority would be a limit on democracy, while absolute democracies are noted for their lack of such limits. As a result, policies may not be stable or long term, because everything is under scrutiny from the voters and may be overturned with a simple majority vote.

Ideology 
An absolute democracy may lead to tyranny of the majority, in which a minority group can be ignored. Absolute democracies function as completely changeable systems where things such as rights and privileges begin to lose meaning, because rights can be voted away at any election.

Relation to absolute monarchy 
An absolute monarchy suggests that all the powers must be concentrated in the person of an hereditary monarch with a divine right to rule (even if in France, for example, he promised during coronation to respect the fundamental laws of the kingdom, so it is different from an arbitrary government), while in this type of democracy, 100% of all power is concentrated into the majority opinion for each issue.  In an absolute democracy, rights become superfluous because they change every time there is an election, and there is nothing keeping legislation permanent or long term.

References

Types of democracy